The 1987 Rhode Island Rams football team was an American football team that represented the University of Rhode Island in the Yankee Conference during the 1987 NCAA Division I-AA football season. In their 12th season under head coach Bob Griffin, the Rams compiled a 1–10 record (1–6 against conference opponents) and finished last out of eight teams in the conference.

Schedule

References

Rhode Island
Rhode Island Rams football seasons
Rhode Island Rams football